Gambling Lady is a 1934 American pre-Code romantic drama film directed by Archie Mayo, and starring Barbara Stanwyck, Joel McCrea and Pat O'Brien.

Plot
Mike Lee raises his daughter Lady Lee to be as honest a gambler as he is. When he gets too much in debt to the underworld syndicate headed by Jim Fallin, he commits suicide rather than be pressured into running a crooked game. Lady initially goes to work for Fallin, then quits and sets out on her own when he tries to "help" her by providing a crooked dealer.

Longtime admirer and bookie Charlie Lang proposes to her, but it is persistent young Garry Madison who wins her heart, despite unknowingly bringing two policemen in disguise to the illegal gambling den where she is playing. She resists marrying him, fearing the reaction of his high society father, Peter, but Garry is pleased to learn that she already knows and likes his father, a fellow gambler. However, Peter does disapprove of the union, offering to buy her off. When she rejects his money, but meekly gives up Garry, Peter realizes he has mistaken her motives. Being a sporting man, he offers to cut cards for his son. He draws a jack, but Lady picks a queen, and the young couple get married.

They are happy at first, but then both feel the pangs of jealousy. When Garry's old girlfriend, Sheila Aiken, returns from Europe, he makes the mistake of greeting her too warmly. Lady challenges her to a game of cards, and wins her jewelry. When Charlie Lang is arrested, Garry refuses his wife's request for $10,000 to bail him out, so she pawns Sheila's jewels to raise the money. Charlie offers to reimburse her, telling her that he intends to pressure the syndicate into paying for his silence about what he knows. Garry becomes incensed when Lady's involvement with Charlie is reported in the newspapers. He goes out to recover the pawn ticket, now in Charlie's hands. Garry does not return that night.

The next day, two policemen inform Lady that Garry has been arrested for Charlie's murder, having been seen arguing with him and later being found in possession of the pawn ticket. Lady figures out that Garry spent the night with Sheila, but is unwilling to use that as an alibi. Lady sees Sheila, who is willing to testify, but only if Lady divorces her husband and insists on $250,000 alimony. Lady agrees to her terms.

Garry is released and the divorce is granted. Both Garry and Peter believe at first that Lady was in it for the money all along, but when Peter sees her tear up the check, he realizes they were wrong. Garry tricks Sheila into admitting the truth, then reconciles with Lady.

Cast

 Barbara Stanwyck as Jennifer "Lady" Lee
 Joel McCrea as Garrison "Garry" Madison
 Pat O'Brien as Charlie Lang
 Claire Dodd as Sheila Aiken
 C. Aubrey Smith as Peter Madison
 Robert Barrat as Mike Lee
 Arthur Vinton as Jim Fallin
 Phillip Reed as Steve
 Philip Faversham as Don Carroway
 Robert Elliott as Graves
 Ferdinand Gottschalk as Cornelius
 Willard Robertson as District Attorney

Reception
Mordaunt Hall, critic for The New York Times, called it "a film which is strong on action and weak on plausibility." While he applauded the performances of McCrea and Smith, he only credited Stanwyck with "an adequate portrayal" and thought that Dodd was miscast.

According to Warner Bros. records the film earned $495,000 domestically and $158,000 internationally.

References

External links

 
 
 
 

1934 films
1934 romantic drama films
American black-and-white films
American romantic drama films
Films directed by Archie Mayo
American films about gambling
Warner Bros. films
1930s English-language films
1930s American films
Films scored by Bernhard Kaun